The following lists events that happened during 1885 in the Kingdom of Belgium.

Incumbents
Monarch: Leopold II
Prime Minister: Auguste Marie François Beernaert

Events

 Belgian State Railways Type 6 steam locomotive taken into use.
 26 February – Conclusion of the Berlin Conference granting sovereignty over the Congo Basin to Leopold II.
 6 April – Inaugural meeting of the Belgian Labour Party held in Brussels.
 30 April – Leopold II receives parliamentary authorisation to assume sovereignty over the Congo Basin
 2 May – World Exhibition in Antwerp opens (to 2 November)
 1 August – Congo Free State established

Publications
Periodicals
 Bulletin du Musée royal d'histoire naturelle de Belgique, vol. 3.

Books
 Karl Baedeker, Belgium and Holland: Handbook for Travellers
 Joseph Van den Gheyn, Essais de mythologie et de philologie comparée

Art and architecture

Paintings
 Fernand Khnopff, Portrait of Jeanne Kéfer
 Constantin Meunier, The Potato Diggers
 Théo van Rysselberghe, Portrait of Octave Maus

Sculptures
 Thomas Vinçotte, The Horse Tamer (Brussels)

Births
 29 January – Raoul Van Overstraeten, general (died 1977)
 29 June – Camille Clifford, actress (died 1971)
 17 November – Henri De Man, politician (died 1953)

Deaths

 27 May – Charles Rogier (born 1800), politician
 20 August – Édouard Agneessens (born 1842), painter
 9 October – Joseph Geefs (born 1808), sculptor

References

 
1880s in Belgium
Belgium
Years of the 19th century in Belgium
Belgium